The Streatfeild River is a river in Kenora District in Northwestern Ontario, Canada.  It is a right tributary of the Attawapiskat River and its source is Streatfeild Lake, adjacent to the headwaters of the neighbouring Kapiskau River. The river lies in the Hudson Bay Lowlands and is part of the James Bay drainage basin.

See also
List of rivers of Ontario

References

Sources

Rivers of Kenora District
Tributaries of Hudson Bay